Bear Nation is a 2010 documentary film directed by Malcolm Ingram that focuses on the Bear movement within the gay community.  The executive producer is Kevin Smith.

Plot 
"Malcolm Ingram introduces us to gay men who dig big dudes who are stockier and hairier than the airbrushed ideal served by up lifestyle magazines and underwear ads. From 'bear runs' - the circuit parties of the ursine - to men proudly accepting their own bodies (and the beer bellies the want to cuddle), Bear Nation proves love really does come in all shapes and sizes."

References

External links 

Bear (gay culture)
Gay-related films
2010 films
2010s English-language films
American LGBT-related films
Documentary films about gay men
View Askew Productions films
American documentary films
Films directed by Malcolm Ingram
2010s American films